AltaVista is search engine company, which is now owned by Yahoo!.

Alta Vista (Spanish and Portuguese expression that literally means "a view from above") or Altavista or variation, may also refer to:

Places

Belize 
 Alta Vista, Belize, a village in Stann Creek District, Belize

Canada 
Alta Vista, Ottawa, neighbourhood in the country's capital city of Ottawa, Ontario
Alta Vista Drive, suburban road in the Alta Vista neighbourhood of Ottawa
Alta Vista Ward, municipal election ward which includes the Alta Vista neighborhood, along with others in Ottawa

Mexico 
Altavista (Zacatecas), a Mesoamerican archaeological site in Zacatecas
Altavista petroglyph complex in Nayarit
Altavista (Mexico City Metrobús), a BRT station in Mexico City

United States 
Alta Vista, California
Alta Vista, Iowa 
Alta Vista, Kansas
Alta Vista Township, Minnesota
Alta Vista, Missouri
Alta Vista High School (Arizona), in Tucson, Arizona
Alta Vista High School (California), in Mountain View, California
Alta Vista Terrace District, a historic district in Chicago, Illinois
 Altavista, Virginia
 Altavista High School, Virginia
 Altavista Downtown Historic District, Virginia

Other uses 
 Juan Carlos Altavista (1929-1989), Argentinian actor
 AltaVista Firewall, discontinued firewall product from Digital Equipment Corporation (DEC)

See also 

 Alta Vista High School (disambiguation)
 
 
 
 
 Vista (disambiguation)
 Alta (disambiguation)